The 2012 World Allround Speed Skating Championships took place on 17 and 18 February 2012, at the Krylatskoye Sport Complex in Moscow, Russia.

Defending champions were Ireen Wüst and Ivan Skobrev. Wüst successfully defended her title, and won her third world allround title overall. Sven Kramer became world allround champion for the fifth time, tying the record by Oscar Mathisen and Clas Thunberg.

Women's championships

Allround Results 

NQ = Not qualified for the 5000m (only the best 12 are qualified)
Note: Marrit Leenstra did qualify for the 5000m but withdrew, Jilleanne Rookard took her place
Source: live.ISUresults.eu

Men's championships

Allround results 

NQ = Not qualified for the 10000 m (only the best 12 are qualified)
DQ = disqualified
Source: live.ISUresults.eu

Rules 
All 24 participating skaters are allowed to skate the first three distances; 12 skaters may take part on the fourth distance. These 12 skaters are determined by taking the standings on the longest of the first three distances, as well as the samalog standings after three distances, and comparing these lists as follows:

 Skaters among the top 12 on both lists are qualified.
 To make up a total of 12, skaters are then added in order of their best rank on either list. Samalog standings take precedence over the longest-distance standings in the event of a tie.

References 

World Allround Speed Skating Championships, 2012
2012 World Allround
World Allround, 2012
Sports competitions in Moscow
World Allround Speed Skating